In computer programming, a poltergeist (or gypsy wagon) is a short-lived, typically stateless object used to perform initialization or to invoke methods in another, more permanent class. It is considered an anti-pattern. The original definition is by Michael Akroyd 1996 - Object World West Conference:
"As a gypsy wagon or a poltergeist appears and disappears mysteriously, so does this short lived object. As a consequence the code is more difficult to maintain and there is unnecessary resource waste. The typical cause for this anti-pattern is poor object design."  

A poltergeist can often be identified by its name; they are often called "manager_", "controller_", "supervisor", "start_process", etc.

Sometimes, poltergeist classes are created because the programmer anticipated the need for a more complex architecture.  For example, a poltergeist arises if the same method acts as both the client and invoker in a command pattern, and the programmer anticipates separating the two phases.  However, this more complex architecture may actually never materialize.

Poltergeists should not be confused with long-lived, state-bearing objects of a pattern such as model–view–controller, or tier-separating patterns such as business-delegate.

To remove a poltergeist, delete the class and insert its functionality in the invoked class, possibly by inheritance or as a mixin.

See also
 Anti-pattern
 Factory (object-oriented programming)
 YAGNI principle

References

External links
 Development AntiPatterns

Anti-patterns